Amplirhagada is a genus of air-breathing land snails, terrestrial pulmonate gastropod mollusks in the family Camaenidae. This genus is endemic to the Kimberley region in northwesternmost Western Australia, where it represents the most species-rich genus of land snails.

Characteristic features
Amplirhagada-species exhibit variable shells ranging from broadly conical to highly turreted in shape. Shells are comparatively large, ranging from about 10 to 25 mm in height and from about 15 to 30 mm in diameter. Shells are often banded but uniformly brown species are also known. The umbilicus is narrowly winding and open, partly or completely concealed by the columellar reflection.
Typical features of the genital organs comprise presence of penial sheath and penial verge and absence of an epiphallus.

Species
Currently, 56 species are known. These include:

 Amplirhagada alta Solem, 1981
 Amplirhagada anderdonensis Köhler, 2010
 Amplirhagada astuta (Iredale, 1939)
 Amplirhagada basilica Köhler, 2010
 Amplirhagada berthierana Köhler, 2010
 Amplirhagada boongareensis Köhler, 2010
 Amplirhagada buffonensis Köhler, 2010
 Amplirhagada burnerensis (E.A. Smith, 1894)
 Amplirhagada burrowsena Iredale, 1939
 Amplirhagada cambridgensis Solem, 1988
 Amplirhagada camdenensis Köhler, 2010
 Amplirhagada carinata Solem, 1981
 Amplirhagada castra Solem, 1981
 Amplirhagada combeana Iredale, 1938
 Amplirhagada confusa Solem, 1981
 Amplirhagada crystalla (Solem, 1981)
 Amplirhagada decora Köhler, 2010
 Amplirhagada depressa (Solem, 1981)
 Amplirhagada descartesana Köhler, 2010
 Amplirhagada drysdaleana Solem, 1981
 Amplirhagada dubitabile Köhler, 2010
 Amplirhagada elevata Solem, 1981
 Amplirhagada euroa Köhler, 2010
 Amplirhagada gemina Köhler, 2010
 Amplirhagada gibsoni Köhler, 2010
 Amplirhagada herbertena Iredale, 1939
 Amplirhagada imitata (E.A. Smith, 1894)
 Amplirhagada indistincta Köhler, 2010
 Amplirhagada intermedia (Solem, 1981)
 Amplirhagada kalumburuana Solem, 1981
 Amplirhagada katerana Solem, 1981
 Amplirhagada kessneri Köhler, 2010
 Amplirhagada kimberleyana Köhler, 2010
 Amplirhagada lamarckiana Köhler, 2010
 Amplirhagada mckenziei Köhler, 2010
 Amplirhagada mitchelliana Solem, 1981
 Amplirhagada montalevitensis (E.A. Smith, 1894)
 Amplirhagada montesqieuana Köhler, 2010
 Amplirhagada napierana Solem, 1981
 Amplirhagada novelta Iredale, 1939
 Amplirhagada osmondi Solem, 1988
 Amplirhagada percita (Iredale, 1939)
 Amplirhagada ponderi Köhler, 2010
 Amplirhagada puescheli Köhler, 2010
 Amplirhagada pusilla Solem, 1981
 Amplirhagada questroana Solem, 1981
 Amplirhagada regia Köhler, 2010
 Amplirhagada solemiana Köhler, 2010
 Amplirhagada sphaeroidea Köhler, 2010
 Amplirhagada sykesi (E.A. Smith, 1894)
 Amplirhagada tricenaria Köhler, 2010
 Amplirhagada uwinsensis Köhler, 2010
 Amplirhagada varia Solem, 1981
 Amplirhagada wilsoni Solem, 1981
 Amplirhagada yorkensis Köhler, 2010

References

 
Camaenidae
Taxonomy articles created by Polbot